Hannah Paul Solomon (October 10, 1908 – September 16, 2011) was an American community leader and artist. She was the first female mayor of Fort Yukon, Alaska, helped organize the Fairbanks Native Association, and was inducted into the Alaska Women's Hall of Fame in 2012. Her traditional beadwork is in the collections of several museums.

Early life 
She was born in Rampart, a village on the Porcupine River, near the Canadian-Alaskan border. Her first language was Gwich'in. She was adopted by older Athabascan parents, Mardow and Eliza Mardow. She attended a one-room school run by the Bureau of Indian Affairs in Fort Yukon.

Career 
Solomon helped to organize the Fairbanks Native Association and the Fairbanks Native Community Center, along with her longtime friend Poldine Carlo and others. She served on the board of directors of the Gwichyaa Zhee Corporation. She was active in other organizations, including Doyon Limited, Tanana Chiefs Conference and the Alaska Federation of Natives. She served in the first city council of Fort Yukon in 1960, and was the first woman to be elected mayor of the city. In 1991 she gave an oral history interview to the University of Alaska Fairbanks Rasmuson Library's Oral History Collection. She was inducted into the Alaska Women's Hall of Fame in 2012.

Solomon was known for her traditional beadwork. "When I was young we had nothing to do when we got home from school so I learned to sew," she explained in 1965. In 1967, she demonstrated beadwork as part of the "Native Village" exhibit at the Alaska 67 Centennial Exposition. Beadwork items made by Solomon are in the collections of the Rasmuson Museum in Anchorage and the Alaska Native Medical Center, among other institutions. A video about Solomon's art was shown at the Sheldon Jackson Museum in 1988 and 1990.

Personal life and legacy 
Mardow married Paul Solomon, a trapper and carpenter, in 1927. They had 14 children together, including activist Jonathon Solomon. She was widowed when her husband died in 1973. She died in 2011, aged 102, at her home in Fairbanks. There is a Hannah Paul Solomon “Woman of Courage” Award given annually by the Fairbanks Native Association.

Notes

References

1908 births
2011 deaths
Alaska Native activists
Alaskan Athabaskan people
American centenarians
Women centenarians
Gwich'in people
People from Fort Yukon, Alaska
Women mayors of places in Alaska
21st-century American women
Native American bead artists
20th-century Native American women
20th-century Native Americans
21st-century Native American women
21st-century Native Americans
Women beadworkers
Artists from Alaska